Jérôme Garcin (born 4 October 1956) is a French journalist and writer. He heads the cultural section of the Nouvel Observateur, produces and hosts the radio program  on France Inter, and is a member of the reading committee of the Comédie-Française.

Biography 

Jérôme Garcin was a pupil at the lycée Henri-IV in Paris before undertaking journalism studies. He then worked for the weekly . He published his first poems in the early eighties. In 1989, he succeeded Pierre Bouteiller to animate the show The Masque and the Plume of France Inter, of which he later became the producer. He also holds the position of deputy director of the weekly Le Nouvel Observateur and collaborates with the newspaper . A former member of the Prix Décembre, he was elected to the Prix Renaudot in March 2010 In the same year he was a member of the Prix Françoise Sagan.

In 1994, he received the prix Médicis essai for Pour Jean Prévost. The son of Philippe Garcin, an editor at the Presses universitaires de France (PUF), who died at the age of 45 as a result of a horse accident, He would dedicate him his first novel, La Chute de cheval, for which he was awarded the Prix Roger Nimier in 1998. When he was six, he accidentally lost his twin brother Olivier. He will dedicate him Olivier, a narrative published in 2011.

Garcin won the Grand prix de littérature Henri-Gal of the Académie française in 2013 and the Prix Prince Pierre de Monaco in 2008.

He is married to actress , the daughter of actor Gérard Philipe.

Controversy 
The website  suggested a conflict of interest between his profession of literary criticism, of animator producing the most prescriptive radio program in literary matter, and that of writer: the highly praising critics of Jérôme Garcin's works would not be alien to the dominant position he occupies in the French literary microcosm.

Works 
 1994: Pour Jean Prévost, Gallimard  – Prix Médicis essai 1994
 1995: Littérature vagabonde, Flammarion
 1998: La Chute de cheval, Gallimard – Prix Roger Nimier 1998, 
 1999: Barbara, claire de nuit, La Martinière Groupe, 
 2001: , Gallimard,  – Hérault de Séchelles's imagined confessions
 2003: Théâtre intime – Prix France Télévisions essai 2003
 2004: Bartabas (novel), éd. Gallimard  – biographie romancée sur l'écuyer Bartabas ; Prix Jean-Freustié
 2005: Le Masque et la Plume with Daniel Garcia, anthology of the program
 2006: Cavalier seul : journal équestre, Gallimard
 2007: Les Sœurs de Prague, Gallimard,
 2007: Nouvelles Mythologies (collective work under his direction, and writing of the text Le Corps nu d'Emmanuelle Béart), éditions du Seuil 
 2008: Son excellence, monsieur mon ami, Gallimard  – Prix Duménil 2008
 2009: Les livres ont un visage, Mercure de France
 2010: L'Écuyer mirobolant, Gallimard, 
 2011: Olivier, éd. Gallimard 
 2012: Fraternité secrète in collaboration with Jacques Chessex, éditions Grasset, 
 2013: , Gallimard – Prix des romancières 2014 
 2014: Le Voyant, Gallimard – biography of blind resistant Jacques Lusseyran – prix Nice Baie des Anges 2015 – Prix Relay des Voyageurs Lecteurs 2015 – Prix d’une vie
 2015: Nos dimanches soirs, co-éd. Grasset/France-Inter – Le Masque et la Plume et son histoire

References

External links 
 Jérôme Garcin on Wiki sources
 Jérôme Garcin on L'Obs
 Jérôme Garcin on Gallimard
 Jérôme Garcin on the site of the Académie française

1956 births
Living people
Writers from Paris
20th-century French journalists
21st-century French journalists
20th-century French writers
21st-century French writers
20th-century French essayists
21st-century French essayists
French radio presenters
French literary critics
Roger Nimier Prize winners
Prix des romancières recipients
Prix Médicis essai winners
Lycée Henri-IV alumni
Radio France people